is a Japanese snowboarder who competes internationally.
 
She represented Japan at the 2018 Winter Olympics.

References

External links

1990 births
Living people
Japanese female snowboarders
Olympic snowboarders of Japan
Snowboarders at the 2018 Winter Olympics
Place of birth missing (living people)
21st-century Japanese women